Prisca Abah (born December 13, 1999) is a Ghanaian model. In 2018, she was awarded the 2018 Woman Model of the Year at the maiden edition of Ghana Outstanding Women Awards (GOWA). The same year, she also won  the Top Model of the Year award at the maiden Ghana Modelling Industry and Heroes Awards organized by the Models Union of Ghana (MODUGA). Abah is the Director of Protocol of the United Nations Youth Ghana. As UN Youth Ambassador SDG 12, she represented Ghana at the 2nd Global Sustainable Rice Conference and Exhibition in Thailand in 2019.

Career 
Abah has appeared at fashion shows in Ghana including Lagos Fashion and Design Week, Lagos fashion Awards, Ghana fashion awards, Fashion Gh weekend, Passion for fashion, Radford graduation fashion show and the Mercedes Benz African fashion Festival. She has worked with top fashion designers including Ejiro Amos Tafiri, Çharlotte Prive, Melanie Crane, Bello Edu, Nicolinegh, Quophi Akotuah, Adeziwavade, Larry J and Nallem Clothing.

Awards 

 Gh Top Model 4 Star Diamond Award winner
 Afroma Award-Runway Model off the Year 2017
 2018 Woman Model of the Year - Ghana Outstanding Awards
 2018 Top Model of the year - Ghana Modeling Industry and Heroes Awards

References

Living people
Ghanaian female models
1999 births